Enneapterygius pallidus is a species of triplefin blenny from the Red Sea where it is found at depths of  and is associated with reefs.

References

Fish described in 1980
pallidus